Richard Thompson, D.D. (b Wakefield 11 March 1648; d Bristol 29 November 1685) was Dean of Bristol from 1684 until his death.

Thompson was born in Wakefield and educated at Magdalene College, Cambridge. He held livings at Duston, Bedminster and Redcliffe.

He died in May 1617.

References

1648 births
1685 deaths
17th-century English Anglican priests
Alumni of Magdalene College, Cambridge
Deans of Bristol
People from Wakefield